Atlantooccipital membrane can refer to:
 Anterior atlantooccipital membrane
 Posterior atlantooccipital membrane